Shuweihat are the members of an ethnic minority in Chad and Sudan, which belongs to the Baggara Arabs. Most of them are Muslims. They speak the Shuwa dialect of the Arabic language.

There are about 2 million Shuweihat.

Baggara tribes
Ethnic groups in Chad
Ethnic groups in Sudan